Witta may refer to:
Witta (Wicca), a witchcraft tradition created by author Edain McCoy
Witta of Büraburg, a missionary and bishop in 8th-century Germany
Witta, son of Wecta, a Jutish chieftain in 5th-century sub-Roman Britain
Witta (Bishop of Lichfield) (before 737 - c. 750)
Witta, Queensland, a town in the Sunshine Coast Region, Queensland, Australia

See also
Witan, or Witenagemot, historic English council